Myles Truitt (born February 1, 2002) is an American actor best known for his breakout role as Eli Solinski in Kin. He also plays Ant in Queen Sugar and Issa Williams on Black Lightning.

Biography
Myles Truitt became interested in acting at the age of 11. He made his debut as young Ronnie DeVoe in The New Edition Story. He continued acting in minor roles on television until he made his big screen debut in Kin. Truitt felt the role was personal to him stating, "Before I saw the script, I saw the short film...and knowing the story behind it, and how Eli created himself, I knew I wanted the role because I connected with Eli." He appeared on Atlanta as Devin, a boy who experiences bullying. He won the role of Ant on Queen Sugar and appeared in Black Lightning as Issa Williams. Truitt was unfamiliar with the comic book character, but became interested upon appearing in the series.

Filmography

References

External links

Living people
2002 births
Actors from Atlanta
Male actors from Atlanta
Actors from Georgia (U.S. state)
Male actors from Georgia (U.S. state)
African-American male actors
African-American actors
21st-century African-American people